Dwayne Davis (born November 27, 1989) is an American professional basketball player for Club Trouville of the Liga Uruguaya de Básquetbol. At 6'5", he plays as a small forward. Davis entered the 2013 NBA draft but was not selected in the draft's two rounds.

College career 
Davis managed to become the first person in his family to finish high school, which allowed him to make a name in Strawberry Mansion High School, noted in the NJCAA. He started playing college basketball in 2009 with Redlands Community College. He also played college basketball at Midland College, College of Midland, until it appeared a coach who changed his life, Donnie Tyndall. It was really a bet on him in his youth, and gave him the chance to play in the NCAA wearing the shirt of the University of Southern Miss.
In the 2012/13 season he averaged 16 points, 4.5 rebounds and 2.6 assists per game in 34 games  with Southern Miss Golden Eagles. He had a success rate of 53.2% shooting two and 41.3% in threes.

Professional career
After the NBA Draft he moved to play in Europe for the UCAM Murcia from the Liga ACB.

For the 2014–15, he signed with Koroivos Amaliadas of the Greek Basket League. In 13 games for Koroivos in 2014–15 season, he averaged 12.5 points, 3.8 rebounds, 1.1 assists and 0.4 steals per game.
He renewed his contract with Koroivos for one more season and he became the star of the club. In 19 games for Koroivos in the 2015–16 season, he averaged 18.3 points, 5.1 rebounds, 1.8 assists and 0.8 steals per game, being the second scorer of the league, including an amazing 36point performance against Arkadikos.

On April 23, 2016, Davis signed with Hoops Club of the Lebanese Basketball League, replacing Antwain Barbour on the team's squad.

On August 6, 2017, Davis joined Instituto ACC of the LNB.

Davis spent the 2020–21 season in Uruguay with Club Atlético Aguada, averaging 14.9 points, 3.7 rebounds and 3.7 assists per game. On August 8, 2021, he signed with Janus Basket Fabriano of the Serie B Basket. Davis averaged 18.8 points, 4.2 rebounds, and 2.4 assists per game. On January 15, 2022, he signed with Club Trouville.

Personal life
Davis's mother died when he was 13 years old and he had to get a job to help take care of younger siblings.

References

External links
ESAKE.gr Profile
NBADraft.net Profile
ESPN.go.com Profile
DraxtExpress.com Profile

1989 births
Living people
American expatriate basketball people in Argentina
American expatriate basketball people in Greece
American expatriate basketball people in Italy
American expatriate basketball people in Lebanon
American expatriate basketball people in Spain
American expatriate basketball people in Uruguay
American men's basketball players
Basketball players from Philadelphia
CB Murcia players
Club Atlético Aguada players
Greek Basket League players
Instituto ACC basketball players
Koroivos B.C. players
Liga ACB players
Midland Chaps basketball players
Small forwards
Southern Miss Golden Eagles basketball players